The Amur longnose gudgeon (Microphysogobio amurensis) is a species of cyprinid fish endemic to the middle and lower Amur River and Lake Khanka.

References

Microphysogobio
Fish described in 1937